The Europe/Africa Zone was one of the three zones of the regional Davis Cup competition in 2018.

In the Europe/Africa Zone there were three different tiers, called groups, in which teams competed against each other to advance to the upper tier. Winners in Group II advanced to the Europe/Africa Zone Group I. Teams who lost their respective ties competed in the relegation play-offs, with winning teams remaining in Group II, whereas European and African teams who lost their play-offs were relegated respectively to the Europe and Africa Zone Group III in 2019.

Participating nations
Seeds: 
 
 
 
 
 
 
 
 

Remaining nations:
 
 
 
 
 
 
 
 

Draw

 and  promoted to Group I in 2019.

First round

Romania vs. Luxembourg

Morocco vs. Georgia

Slovenia vs. Poland

Zimbabwe vs. Turkey

Egypt vs. Norway

Denmark vs. Ireland

Tunisia vs. Finland

Lithuania vs. Estonia

Second round

Romania vs. Morocco

Poland vs. Zimbabwe

Denmark vs. Egypt

Finland vs. Lithuania

Play-offs

Luxembourg vs. Georgia

Slovenia vs. Turkey

Norway vs. Ireland

Estonia vs. Tunisia

Third round

Romania vs. Poland

Egypt vs. Finland

References

External links
Official Website

Europe/Africa Zone Group II
Davis Cup Europe/Africa Zone